Anson is a given name and surname of English origin, typically arising as a variation of the name, Hanson.

Surname

 Adelbert Anson (1840–1909), Canadian Anglican bishop
 Albert Edward Anson (1879–1936), British actor
 Andy Anson (born 1964/1965), British businessman
 Augustus Anson (1835–1877), British Victoria Cross recipient and politician
 Cap Anson (1852–1922), American baseball player
 Charles H. Anson (1841–1928), American politician and businessman
 Claude Anson (1889–1969), English cricketer
 Edward Anson (1826–1925), British general and colonial governor
 Eric Anson (1892–1969), New Zealand's first specialist anaesthetist
 Frank A. Anson (1844–1909), American politician and businessman
 Frederick Anson (1811–1885), Canon, St. George's Chapel at Windsor Castle
 Geoffrey Anson (1922–1977), English cricketer
 George Anson, 1st Baron Anson (1697–1762), British admiral, noted for his circumnavigation of the globe
 George Anson (politician, born 1731) (1731–1789), British politician
 George Anson (British Army officer, born 1769) (1769–1849), British general during the Peninsular War
 George Anson (British Army officer, born 1797) (1797–1857), British Commander-in-Chief, India, during the Indian rebellion of 1857
 George Anson (priest) (1820–1898),  British clergy and Archdeacon of Manchester
 George Edward Anson (1812–1849), courtier and British politician, Treasurer of the Household to HRH Prince Albert
 George W. Anson (1847–1920), British actor
 Horatio Saint George Anson (1903–1925), British electrical engineer
 Jack L. Anson (1924–1990), American college interfraternity movement leader
 Jay Anson (1921–1980), American author of The Amityville Horror
 Jennifer Anson (born 1977), Palauan judoka athlete
 John Anson (born 1949), Canadian wrestler
 John W. Anson (1817–1881), British actor
 Mortimer Louis Anson (1901–1968), protein scientist
 Pascal Anson (born 1973), English designer and artist 
 Patrick Anson, 5th Earl of Lichfield (1939–2005), British photographer
 Peter Anson (1889–1975), English writer
 Robert Sam Anson (1945–2020), American writer and journalist
 Rupert Anson (1889–1966), English cricketer
 Scott Anson (born 1989), Scottish footballer
 Sir William Anson, 1st Baronet (1772–1847), general in the British Army
 Sir William Anson, 3rd Baronet (1843–1914), English contract lawyer and Liberal Unionist politician
 Talavera Vernon Anson (1809–1895), British naval officer
 Thomas Anson (politician, died 1773) (c. 1695 – 1773), British politician
 Thomas Anson (cricketer) (1818–1899), English clergyman and cricketer
 Thomas Anson, 1st Viscount Anson (1767–1818), British politician and peer

Given name

A-H
 Anson Allen (1838–1880), American politician
 Anson M. Beard (1874–1929), American football player
 Anson Brown (1800–1840), U.S. Representative from New York
 Anson Wood Burchard (1865–1927), American businessman
 Anson Burlingame (1820-1870), American abolitionist and diplomat
 Anson Call (1810–1890), Mormon pioneer
 Anson Vasco Call II (1855–1944), Wyoming Mormon pioneer
 Anson Cameron (born 1961), Australian author
 Anson Carmody (born 1989), Canadian curler
 Anson Carter (born 1974), Canadian ice hockey player
 Anson Chan (born 1940), Hong Kong politician
 Anson Chi (fl. 1990s–2010s), convicted pipeline bomber
 Anson Cornell (1890–1975), American college football player and coach
 Anson Dart (1797–1879), Superintendent for Indian Affairs in the Oregon Territory
 Anson Dickinson (1779–1852), American painter of miniature portraits
 Anson Dodge (1834–1918), American-Canadian lumber dealer and political figure
 Anson Dorrance (born 1951), American soccer coach
 Anson Dyer (1876–1962), English director, screenwriter, animator, and actor
 Anson Funderburgh (born 1954), American blues guitar player and bandleader
 Anson Goodyear (1877–1964), American manufacturer, businessman, author, and philanthropist
 Anson Rogers Graves (1842–1931), first Episcopal bishop of the Missionary District of Western Nebraska
 Anson Harrold (1870–1907), American football player and coach
 Anson Henry (born 1979), Canadian sprinter of Jamaican descent
 Anson G. Henry (1804–1865), American physician and politician
 Anson Herrick (1812–1868), U.S. Representative from New York
 Anson Parsons Hotaling (1827–1900), San Francisco merchant and real estate developer
 Anson Hu (born 1983), Chinese singer

K-Z
 Anson F. Keeler (1887–1943), Connecticut State Comptroller 
 Anson Jones (1798–1858), last President of the Republic of Texas
 Anson Kong (born 1992), Hong Kong singer
 Anson Lo (born 1995), Hong Kong singer
 Anson W. Mackay (fl. 1990s–2010s), professor of geography at University College London
 Anson S. Marshall (1822–1874), American attorney and politician
 Anson G. McCook (1835–1917), American military and political figure
 Anson Mills (1834–1924), United States Army officer, surveyor, inventor, and entrepreneur
 Anson Morrill (1803–1887), 24th governor of Maine
 Anson D. Morse (1846–1916), educator, historian, and professor at Amherst College
 Anson Mount (born 1973), American actor
 Anson Green Phelps (1781–1858), American entrepreneur and business man
 Anson Paul (born 1988), actor in Indian films
 Anson W. Pope (1812–1871), Wisconsin State Assembly member
 Anson Rabinbach (born 1945), historian of modern Europe
 Anson Rainey (1930–2011), Israeli professor of ancient Near Eastern cultures and Semitic linguistics
 Anson O. Reynolds (fl. 1880s–1920s), builder of the Anson O. Reynolds House in Des Moines, Iowa
 Anson Rood (1827–1898), American businessman, farmer, politician, and Wisconsin pioneer
 Anson P. K. Safford (c. 1830–1891), third Governor of Arizona Territory
 Anson D. Shupe (1948–2015), American sociologist
 Anson Stager (1825–1885), co-founder of Western Union
 Anson Phelps Stokes (disambiguation), various people
 Anson Weeks (1896–1969), American dance band leader
 Anson Williams (born 1949), actor and director
 Anson Wilson (fl. 1830s–1860s), builder of the Anson Wilson House in Eastern Iowa
 Anson S. Wood (1834–1904), American lawyer and politician

Middle name
 Robert Anson Heinlein (1907–1988), American science fiction author

See also
Anson (disambiguation)
Hanson (surname)

English-language surnames